Almaz Garifullin (born January 4, 1971) is a Soviet and Russian former professional ice hockey forward. He is a one-time Russian Champion.  After completing his career as a player, he became a coach.

Awards and honors

References

External links

1971 births
Living people
Ak Bars Kazan players
Metallurg Magnitogorsk players
HC Neftekhimik Nizhnekamsk players
HC Sibir Novosibirsk players
Chelmet Chelyabinsk players
Russian ice hockey forwards